is a Japanese badminton player.

Career 
He plays in the men's singles. He participated in the 2014 Asian Junior Badminton Championships, in the 2016 Chinese Taipei Masters and in the 2015 Chinese Taipei Masters Grand Prix.

At the 2016 Vietnam International he reached to the semi-finals as well as at the 2016 Polish Open.

Achievements

Asian Junior Championships 
Boys' doubles

BWF International Challenge/Series (1 title, 1 runner-up) 

Men's singles

Men's doubles

  BWF International Challenge tournament
  BWF International Series tournament
  BWF Future Series tournament

References

External links 

 

Living people
1997 births
Sportspeople from Osaka Prefecture
Japanese male badminton players
21st-century Japanese people